The women's skeet shooting competition at the 2004 Summer Olympics was held on August 19 at the Markópoulo Olympic Shooting Centre near Athens, Greece.

The event consisted of two rounds: a qualifier and a final. In the qualifier, each shooter fired 3 sets of 25 shots in the set order of skeet shooting.

The top 6 shooters in the qualifying round moved on to the final round. There, they fired one additional round of 25. The total score from all 100 shots was used to determine final ranking. Ties are broken using a shoot-off; additional shots are fired one at a time until there is no longer a tie.

Hungarian shooter and 2000 Olympic bronze medalist Diána Igaly set a perfect 25 to claim the gold medal in the final, finishing with a total score of 97. China's Wei Ning had shared a total score of 93 birds with defending Olympic champion Zemfira Meftahatdinova of Azerbaijan, until she chased her rival in a 2 to 1 shoot-off to grab the silver, leaving Meftahatdinova with a bronze.

Records
Prior to this competition, the existing world and Olympic records were as follows.

Qualification round 

Q Qualified for final — SO 1 Shoot-off for fifth place — SO 2 Shoot-off for sixth place

Final

References

External links
Official Results

Women's Skeet
Olymp
Women's events at the 2004 Summer Olympics